Rob Knight (born 1976 in Dunedin, New Zealand) is a professor at the University of California, San Diego and the co-founder of the American Gut Project. He is also a co-founder of the Earth Microbiome Project, and his lab's research involves the development of laboratory and computational techniques to characterize the microbiomes of humans, animals, and the environment.

In 2015, he received the Vilcek Prize for Creative Promise in Biomedical Science.

Knight completed a BSc in biochemistry at the University of Otago and a PhD in Ecology and Evolutionary Biology at Princeton University in 2001, where his thesis was "The Origin and Evolution of the Genetic Code." Until 2014, he was a professor at the University of Colorado Boulder.

He did an IAmA on Reddit and co-taught an online microbiome course on Coursera. He gave a TED Talk in 2014 on the role microbes play on our health. Later this idea was expanded into the book Follow Your Gut: The Enormous Impact of Tiny Microbes, written with science journalist Brendan Buhler and published by Simon & Schuster.

Rob Knight has the prologue and a chapter dedicated to his spirit of exploration in a non-fiction, written for masses, science book I Contain Multitudes. The author Ed Yong highlights his visit to San Diego zoo with Knight where he swabs different animals to study the microbes collected. He explains the intriguing nature of the microorganisms and the way the affect development of life. The book was published in 2016.

American Gut Project
The American Gut Project, which claims to be the world's largest crowdfunded and crowdsourced scientific research project, aims to characterize the human microbiome—the diverse communities of microorganisms that live in and on the human body. Participants make a monetary contribution and submit personal microbiome samples, and receive information about their microbiome.

References

External links
 UC San Diego faculty: Rob Knight
 Knight Lab at UC San Diego
 Knight Lab at University of Colorado
 

1970s births
1976 births
Living people
New Zealand microbiologists
University of California, San Diego faculty
University of Colorado Boulder faculty
Princeton University alumni